Lempaut is a commune in the Tarn department in southern France.

In Lempaut is the 17th century Château de Padiès, a listed monument since 1928.

See also
 Communes of the Tarn department

References

External links
 Visit the Château de Padiès at Lempaut
 CCiiff - Culture&Cultures international intercultural film festival hosted in Lempaut

Communes of Tarn (department)